The governor of Southern Leyte is the local chief executive and head of the Provincial Government of Southern Leyte in the Philippines. Along with the governors of Biliran, Eastern Samar, Leyte, Northern Samar, and Samar, the province's chief executive is a member of the Regional Development Council of the Eastern Visayas Region.

List of governors of Southern Leyte

References

Governors of Southern Leyte
Governors of provinces of the Philippines